Barrage is a video game developed by American studio Mango Grits and published by Activision for Microsoft Windows in 1998. Published by Zoo in the territory of Japan.

Reception

The game received mixed reviews according to the review aggregation website GameRankings. Next Generation said, "As a generic shooter, Barrage is fun, but it won't win any awards. It is, however, relatively inexpensive at $29.99, and that may be its saving grace."

References

External links

Official website

1998 video games
Activision games
First-person shooters
Video games developed in France
Windows games
Windows-only games